The 1934–35 Balkan Cup was the fifth Balkan Cup football tournament. The national teams of Yugoslavia, Greece, Bulgaria and Romania took part and it was won by Yugoslavia. The host of the tournament was Greece and they lost the trophy on the final day on January 1, defeated to Bulgaria by 1–2 as previously on the day Yugoslavia had thrashed Romania by 4–0. This was the first Balkan Cup for Yugoslavia. The top goalscorers were Aleksandar Tirnanić and Aleksandar Tomašević (both from Yugoslavia) with 3 goals each.

Final table

Matches

Winner

Statistics

Goalscorers

References 

1931–32
1934–35 in European football
1934–35 in Romanian football
1934–35 in Bulgarian football
1934–35 in Greek football
1934–35 in Yugoslav football